Ashnola Mountain is a mountain in the Okanagan Range of the North Cascades in Washington state, located near Ashnola Pass and the headwaters of the Ashnola River, which flows north into British Columbia, Canada, to join the Similkameen River.

Name origin
See Ashnola River for name origin.

Notes

External links
 

Cascade Range
Mountains of Okanogan County, Washington
Mountains of Washington (state)